Artedius corallinus, the coralline sculpin, is a species of marine ray-finned fish belonging to the family Cottidae, the typical sculpins. It is found in the eastern North Pacific along the coasts of the western United States and Baja California.

Taxonomy
Artedius corallinus was first formally described as Allartedius corallinus in 1926 by the American ichthyologist Carl Leavitt Hubbs with its type locality given as California. The specific name corallinus means “pertaining to coral”, probably referring to this species association with coralline algae and it’s camouflaged color and pattern.

Description
Artedius corallinus has a large wide flattened head with a mouth reaching the rear edge of its large eyes. The colour is dark gray to rufous on the upper body and head with a pair of clear white bands on the head with a reddish-brown band between them and an obvious white spot at the base of the caudal peduncle. The non paired fins are transparent with brown spines an rays, the pelvic fins are also transparent but are marked with brown barring. There is a row of circular white spots just above the anal fin. The first dorsal fin is supported by 9 spines, the second dorsal fin contains 15-16 soft rays while the anal fin has12-13 soft rays. The pelvic fin contains a single spine and 3 soft rays, the pectoral fins have 15-16 soft rays and the caudal fin is truncate.

Distribution and habitat

Biology
Artedius corallinus feed on algae, amphipods, copepods, polychaetes, shrimps, and gastropods. They are oviparous and fertilization is external. In intertidal areas these fish may have a home pool to which they retreat at low tide but as the tide comes in they follow the advancing waters to forage in pools farther up the beach.

References

External links
 Coralline Sculpin (Artedius corallinus) at the Encyclopedia of Life

corallinus
Fish described in 1926
Fish of the Pacific Ocean
Taxa named by Carl Leavitt Hubbs